Golafshan (also Romanized as Golāfshān) is a Town in Hana Rural District, in the Central District of Semirom County, Isfahan Province, Iran. At the 2021 census, its population was 1545, in 508 families.

instagram: golafshancity

References 

Populated places in Semirom County